Alpha is a former populated place located in Eureka County, Nevada. At its peak in 1874 and 1875, it had a hotel and several saloons.
The town was served by the Eureka and Palisade Railroad, a defunct narrow gauge railroad. The town was abandoned shortly after the railroad was extended to Eureka, Nevada. All that remains today is rubble and the remains of cellars. A ranch at the site is visible in aerial imagery.

Sitka Gold, a Canadian mining company, has begun drilling nearby.

References 

Former populated places in Eureka County, Nevada
Ghost towns in Eureka County, Nevada